The Asian Basketball Club Championship 1992 was the 5th staging of the Asian Basketball Club Championship, the basketball club tournament of Asian Basketball Confederation. The tournament was held in Bangkok, Thailand from April 26 to May 1, 1992.

Final standing

References
Fibaasia.net

1992
Champions Cup
B
Basketball Asia Champions Cup 1992